The 1975 Giro d'Italia was the 58th running of the Giro, one of cycling's Grand Tours. It started in Milan, on 17 May, with a set of split stages and concluded with a summit finish to the Passo dello Stelvio, on 7 June, with another split stage, consisting of an individual time trial and a mass-start stage. A total of 90 riders from nine teams entered the 22-stage race, that was won by Italian Fausto Bertoglio of the Jolly Ceramica team. The second and third places were taken by Spaniard Francisco Galdós and Italian Felice Gimondi, respectively.

Amongst the other classifications that the race awarded, Brooklyn's Roger De Vlaeminck won the points classification and Andrés Oliva and Francisco Galdós of KAS won the mountains classification. Brooklyn finished as the winners of the team points classification. Roger De Vlaeminck won seven stages.

Teams

A total of nine teams were invited to participate in the 1975 Giro d'Italia. Each team sent a squad of ten riders, which meant that the race started with a peloton of 90 cyclists. From the riders that began this edition, 70 made it to the finish on the Passo dello Stelvio.

The teams entering the race were:

Route and stages

The route for the race was revealed on 10 April 1975.

Classification leadership

There were three main individual classifications contested in the 1975 Giro d'Italia, as well as a team competition. Three of them awarded jerseys to their leaders. The general classification was the most important and was calculated by adding each rider's finishing times on each stage. The rider with the lowest cumulative time was the winner of the general classification and was considered the overall winner of the Giro. The rider leading the classification wore a pink jersey to signify the classification's leadership.

The second classification was the points classification. Riders received points for finishing in the top positions in a stage finish, with first place getting the most points, and lower placings getting successively fewer points. The rider leading this classification wore a purple (or cyclamen) jersey. The mountains classification was the third classification and its leader was denoted by the green jersey. In this ranking, points were won by reaching the summit of a climb ahead of other cyclists. Each climb was ranked as either first, second or third category, with more points available for higher category climbs.  Most stages of the race included one or more categorized climbs, in which points were awarded to the riders that reached the summit first. The Cima Coppi, the race's highest point of elevation, awarded more points than the other first category climbs.  The Cima Coppi for this Giro was the Passo dello Stelvio. The first rider to cross the Stelvio was Spanish rider Francisco Galdós.
 
The final classification, the team classification, awarded no jersey to its leaders. This was calculated by adding together points earned by each rider on the team during each stage through the intermediate sprints, the categorized climbs, stage finishes, etc. The team with the most points led the classification.

There were other minor classifications within the race, including the Campionato delle Regioni classification. This was a replacement for the "traguardi tricolore" classification that was calculated in previous years. The leader wore a blue jersey with colored vertical stripes ("maglia azzurra con banda tricolore verticale").

Final standings

General classification

Points classification

Mountains classification

Campionato delle Regioni classification

Combination classification

Team points classification

References

Footnotes

Citations

 
G
Giro d'Italia
Giro d'Italia by year
Giro d'Italia
Giro d'Italia
1975 Super Prestige Pernod